The Montenegrin Second League (Montenegrin: Druga crnogorska fudbalska liga – Druga CFL – 2. CFL) is the second-top football league in Montenegro. It is headed by the Football Association of Montenegro. Second Montenegrin League consists of 10 participants. The top team qualifies for the First League of Montenegro, the second and third one contest in a playoff match against the 8th and 9th team from the First League, while the bottom-placed two teams are relegated to any of the three third-tier leagues, to be replaced by the two winners of a three-way promotion playoffs, contested by the winners of the three Third League divisions.

History

Before independence

During the existence of SFR Yugoslavia, FR Yugoslavia and Serbia and Montenegro, from 1947 to 2006, Montenegrin clubs played in federal leagues. Among them, as a second-tier competitions, were Yugoslav Second League (1947–1992), Second League of FR Yugoslavia (1992–2001) and Second League of Serbia and Montenegro (2001–2006). 
Overall, 25 different Montenegrin teams played in Yugoslav Second League from 1947 to 2006. Most seasons in second-tier spent FK Sutjeska (30), followed by FK Lovćen (27) and OFK Titograd (24).

After independence
Following Montenegrin independence referendum (2006), Football Association of Montenegro established their own competitions – First League, Second League and Third League.

2006–16
On inaugural season 2006–07, members of Second League became three teams from Serbia and Montenegro Second League previous season and nine from third-tier competition (Montenegrin Republic League).
Winner of the first season was Lovćen who won the title after the hard struggle with Ibar and Bokelj. Notable game from the season, Ibar – Lovćen (0:1), played in front od 4,000 spectators, finished with crowd disturbances. At the end of the season, Lovćen gained directly promotion to Prva CFL, while Bokelj won the playoff games against Jedinstvo. Ibar didn't succeed to gain promotion to Prva CFL.
Next year, the title and directly promotion to highest rank surprisingly gained FK Jezero, with four points more than Čelik. In the First League playoffs, Čelik didn't succeed against their city rivals from Sutjeska in two games which watched 17,000 spectators overall (0:0, 0:1). But, third-placed FK Jedinstvo Bijelo Polje made success in playoff games against Bokelj (1:0, 0:0) and made a comeback to First League.
Second League winner for season 2008–09 was Berane, while in the playoffs participated OFK Titograd and Mornar. OFK Titograd lost against FK Dečić, but Mornar made historical success with their first-ever promotion to Prva CFL after the games against Jezero (2:1, 0:0). During the season 2008–09, Otrant scored 12 goals on the match against Ribnica (12:2), which is the all-time record in Montenegrin Second League.
Title for 2009–10 season won OFK Titograd, who made comeback to First League after two seasons. Second-placed OFK Bar made a surprisingly success in playoffs against Berane after the penalties and made their first and last promotion to Prva CFL. Third-placed Bratstvo from Podgorica outskirts lost in playoffs against another team from Bar – Mornar (0:1, 1:2).
Bokelj dominated on season 2010–11, finishing first with 24 points more than second-placed team. After the playoff games, promotion to First League gained Berane, too, while Jedinstvo, which won the second-place, remained in Second League after unsuccessful playoff performances against Sutjeska.
Next year, Second League title won Čelik from Nikšić, with score of 80 points. Except first-ever promotion to the First League in their history, Čelik made notable success in 2011–12 Montenegrin Cup during the same season. They became the first member of Second League which played in the finals and won the national Cup. In final game, played in Podgorica City Stadium, Čelik defeated First-League side Rudar – 2:1. Except that, for the first and so far last time in the history, both representatives of Second League won their games in First League payoffs. Second-placed Mornar eliminated Berane (2:1, 3:0), while third-placed Jedinstvo won against Dečić (0:0, 1:0). So, after the season 2011–12, three teams from Second League moved to First League.
Former elite-member Dečić won the title on season 2012–13 and made a comeback to Prva CFL. Second and third placed Bokelj and Zabjelo lost their games in the playoffs, so only Dečić made a promotion to highest rank. At the beginning of the season, OFK Bar withdraw due to financial difficulties, so the championship had 11 members.
After the edition 2013–14, Bokelj and Berane became a members of Prva CFL – Bokelj as title winner and Berane after the playoff games. During that season, on game Zabjelo – Zora (5–0), player Bojan Kopitović scored five goals, which is the all-time record in Montenegrin Second League.
On season 2014–15, title race between Iskra and Dečić lasted until the end of championship. With two points more than their main opponents, Iskra finished first and made their first-ever promotion to the highest-level competition. But, Dečić gained promotion to Prva CFL too, after the playoff games against former national champions Mogren (2–1; 5–0).
Next year, Jedinstvo became a champion. They won the title race with biggest surprise of championship – Cetinje, while the third finished Bratstvo. But, only Jedinstvo gained promotion. Performances of Cetinje and Bratstvo in playoffs were unsuccessful. That season had 11 members, because Mogren withdraw due to financial troubles before the start of competition.

2016–
On season 2016–17, Kom secured a promotion to Prva CFL after seven years spent in lowest-level competitions. Team from Podgorica outskirts won the first place, while Ibar and Otrant finished second and third, but without promotion.
Montenegrin Second League 2017–18 finished with success of Mornar who won the first place and direct place in Prva CFL 2018–19. Third-placed Lovćen gained promotion after the playoffs against First-League side Kom (1–0; 0–0), while the newcomer in Second League FK Podgorica, who finished second, lost their playoff games. During the same season, last-placed Čelik made few negative-records at that time. Team which once won the Montenegrin Cup and played in UEFA Europe League finished season with only 8 points, 2 wins, 28 losses, longest run without win (20 games) and one of highest loses in the history of Second League (Bokelj – Čelik 10–0).
Next year, four weeks before the end of competition, FK Podgorica secured the title and their first ever promotion to the top flight. At the same time, Kom and Bokelj, as a second and third placed, participated in the playoffs for First League. As a two last placed teams, Igalo and Berane were relegated to Montenegrin Third League.
Season 2019–20 was interrupted after 30 weeks, due to the coronavirus pandemic. Therefore, Dečić, who had 10 points more than second-placed Jezero, gained direct promotion to Prva CFL. As Football Association of Montenegro decided, runner-up and third-placed squad at the moment of disruption (Jezero and Bokelj), participated in the playoffs for Prva CFL. While FK Jezero gained promotion to Prva CFL, FK Bokelj was eliminated after the penalties against OFK Titograd. From the other side, two worst-placed teams (Lovćen and Otrant) were relegated. That was the first time in the history when FK Lovćen, the oldest Montenegrin club, went to the bottom-tier. Except that, team from Cetinje was relegated to Montenegrin Third League only one year after they played in Prva CFL and in the final game of Montenegrin Cup.
Mornar won the title on season 2020–21 and secured comeback to top-tier after two consecutive seasons in Second League. Second and third placed Arsenal and Igalo didn't succeed to gain promotion via playoffs, as they were defeated against Iskra and OFK Petrovac. Two last-placed teams – Ibar and Drezga were relegated to Third League, both after two consecutive seasons spent in second-tier. During the season, Mornar made one of the all-time biggest victories in the history of competition, against Drezga (10–0).

Relegation and promotion

At the end of every season, champion of Second League is directly promoted to First League, while last placed member of First League is moving to second-tier competition. Except that, second and third placed teams from Second League are participating in First League playoffs. Their opponents are 8th and 9th team from the First League.
From the other side, two last placed teams are directly relegated to Montenegrin Third League. At the end of the season, winners of three Third League groups are participating in playoffs for Second League promotion. Two best placed teams from playoffs are gaining promotion to Montenegrin Second League.

Changes in league structure
In period 2006–2018, Montenegrin Second League consisted of 12 participants. From 2018 to 2019 season, the number of participants is reduced to 10, with 36 week-long competition.
Number of teams:
 2006–07 to 2007–18: 12
 Since 2018–19: 10

Champions and top goalscorers by season

Champions
From season 2006–07, 12 different clubs won the title in Montenegrin Second League. Jedinstvo, FK Bokelj and FK Dečić are the clubs which had won the title twice.

Top scorers
During the history, the biggest number of goals during the single season scored FK Podgorica's attacker Elie Matuoke (23), during the season 2017–18. Until now, he is the only foreign player to become a topscorer in any of two highest Montenegrin football leagues.

All time tables

Overall
Montenegrin Second League is existing as a competition under the national football association of Montenegro from the season 2006–07. Overall, 31 different clubs participated in the Montenegrin Second League. FK Ibar and FK Jezero are the teams which played the biggest number of seasons in Second League.
Below is the list of all matches and seasons by every single slub in Montenegrin Second League from 2006 until now. For the previous period and Montenegrin clubs which participated in the Yugoslav Second League, see Montenegrin clubs in Yugoslav football competitions (1946–2006).

Ssn = Number of seasons; Pld = Matches played; W = Matches won; D = Matches drawn; L = Matches lost; GD = Goal difference; Pts = Points;

Participants by season

Records And statistics

Records by seasons
Most points: 80, Čelik, season 2011–12
Least points: 8, Čelik, season 2017–18
Highest number of wins: 25, Čelik, season 2011–12
Lowest number of wins: 2, Ribnica, season 2008–09; Čelik, season 2017–18
Highest number of losses: 28, Čelik, season 2017–18
Lowest number of losses: 3, Čelik, season 2011–12; Dečić, season 2019–20
Highest number of scored goals: 75, Titograd, season 2009–10
Lowest number of scored goals: 13, Cetinje, season 2017–18 
Highest number of conceded goals: 94, Čelik, season 2017–18
Lowest number of conceded goals: 11, Mornar, season 2017–18

Runs
Longest unbeaten run: 23 matches, Čelik, 18.09.2011 – 09.05.2012, season 2011–12
Longest run without win: 24 matches, Berane, 22.08.2018 – 03.04.2019, season 2018–19
Longest winning streak: 10 matches, Čelik, 13.11.2011 – 15.04.2012, season 2011–12
Longest losing streak: 14 matches, Ribnica, 15.03.2009 – 30.05.2009, season 2008–09
Longest run without conceded goal: 13 matches, Mornar, 07.03.2018 – 16.05.2018, season 2017–18
Longest run without scored goal: 7 matches, Berane, 14.10.2018 – 02.12.2018, season 2018–19
Longest run of goalless matches (0:0): 4 matches, Mornar, 13.08.2017 – 03.19.2017, season 2017–18

Single game
Biggest league victory/defeat: 12–2, Otrant vs. Ribnica, 20.05.2009, Ulcinj (season 2008–09); 10–0, Bokelj – Čelik, 08.04.2018, Kotor (season 2017–18); 10–0, Mornar – Drezga, 12.05.2021, Bar (season 2020–21)
Biggest league victory away: 0–7, Berane vs. Bratstvo, 18.11.2012, Berane (season 2012–13), Radnički vs. Berane, 22.05.2017, Berane, (season 2016–17)
Most goals in a single game: 14, Otrant vs. Ribnica 12–2, 20.05.2009, Ulcinj (season 2008–09)
Player with most goals on a single game: 5, Bojan Kopitović (Zabjelo), Zabjelo vs. Zora 5–0, 03.11.2013 (season 2013–14); Aldin Mušović (Jedinstvo), Cetinje vs. Jedinstvo 0–8, 27.04.2022 (season 2021–22)
Highest single game attendance: 4,000, Ibar vs. Lovćen 0:1, 11.04.2007, Rožaje (season 2006–07); Jedinstvo vs. Arsenal 1:1, 13.04.2022, Bijelo Polje (season 2021–22)

Attendance by season

M = Number of matches (only matches with spectators counted); H = Highest attendance on one match; CH = Club with highest average attendance; CL = Club with lowest average attendance

Current clubs (2022–23)
The 2022–23 Montenegrin Second League is the 17th season of second-tier football competition in Montenegro. The season started in August 2022 and will end in May 2023.
The following 10 clubs complete in Second League 2022–23.

Grounds
Since establishing (season 2006–07), Montenegrin Second League matches has been played in 26 different stadiums. Biggest stadium, used by FK Berane and FK Radnički, is Berane City Stadium. Except that, there was only two stadiums with more than 5,000 seats which hosted Second League games – Sveti Petar Cetinjski and Pljevlja City Stadium. Below is the list of stadiums on which played members of Second League from season 2006–07 until now.

Logo and broadcasting

Official logo and equipment
Logo of Montenegrin Second League was presented in 2018, together with the new logos of Montenegrin First League, Montenegrin Cup and youth leagues.
Official ball of competition is produced under the Derbystar brand, while the official equipment of referees is product of Legea.

Broadcasting rights
Since foundation of the competition, official broadcaster of Second Montenegrin League matches is national television of Montenegro – RTCG. 
From season 2018–19, broadcaster of matches is cable-network channel MNE Sport TV. Every weekend, one game is broadcast on their channels.

See also
Montenegrin First League playoffs
Montenegrin Cup
Montenegrin First League
Montenegrin Third League
Football in Montenegro
Montenegrin clubs in Yugoslav football competitions (1946-2006)

External links and references
Football Association of Montenegro – Official Site
RSSSF Montenegro Second League

 
2
Second level football leagues in Europe
Sports leagues established in 2006
2006 establishments in Montenegro